A traditional economic system is based on customs, history and time-honored beliefs. A traditional economy is an economic system in which traditions, customs, and beliefs help shape the goods and  services the economy produces, as well as the rule and manner of their distribution. Countries that use this type of economic system are often rural and farm-based. Also known  as a subsistence economy, a traditional economy is defined by bartering and trading. A little surplus is produced and if any excess goods are made, they are typically given to a ruling authority or landowner.

A pure traditional economy has had no changes in how it operates (there are few of these today). Examples of these traditional economies include those of the Inuit or those of the tea plantations in South India.  Traditional economies are popularly conceived of as "primitive" or "undeveloped" economic systems, having tools or techniques seen as outdated. As with the notion of contemporary primitiveness and with modernity itself, the view that traditional economies are backward is not shared by scholars in economics and anthropology. Two current examples of a traditional or custom based economy are Bhutan and Haiti (Haiti is not a traditional economy according to CIA Factbook ).

Traditional economies may be based on custom and tradition,  with economic decisions based on customs or beliefs of the community, family, clan, or tribe.

See also 
 Agricultural economics
 Manorialism
 Subsistence agriculture

References 

Economic systems